Mathilde Comont (9 September 1886 – 21 June 1938), credited also as Mathilda Caumont, was a French-born American actress, primarily of  the silent era.

Biography
Born in Bordeaux, she appeared in films in her native country, particularly shorts, from 1908 and 1910, and then she appeared in U.S. films, starting with a few film shorts in 1917 and features including more than 60 films between 1919 and 1937, primarily as a supporting player, with several uncredited smaller roles. A heavy and short woman of 5 feet, 4 inches (163 cm), she died aged 51 from a heart attack in Hollywood, California.

Partial filmography

 Max Wants a Divorce (1917) - Loony Diva
 A Rogue's Romance (1919)
 A Tale of Two Worlds (1921) - Shopper (uncredited)
 Rosita (1923) - Rosita's mother
 The Thief of Bagdad (1924) - the corpulent Prince of Persia (uncredited)
 Mademoiselle Midnight (1924) - Dueña / Mme. Nellie
 His Hour (1924) - Fat Harem Lady
 Playing with Souls (1925) - Brothel Worker (uncredited)
 If Marriage Fails (1925) - Lisa
 The Sea Beast (1926) - Mula
 The Enchanted Hill (1926) - Conchita
 The Girl from Montmartre (1926) - Carmenata
 The Far Cry (1926) - Maid
 La Bohème (1926) - Madame Benoit
 The Gilded Highway (1926) - Sarah
 Kiki (1926) - Maid (uncredited)
 Paris at Midnight (1926) - Madame Vauquer
 Volcano! (1926) - Madame Timbuctoo
 Puppets (1926) - Rosa
 The Passionate Quest (1926) - (uncredited)
 What Price Glory? (1926) - Camille
 Rose of the Tenements (1926) - Mrs. Kohn
 The Whole Town's Talking (1926) - Maid (scenes deleted)
 The Wrong Mr. Wright (1927)
 The Loves of Carmen (1927) - Emilia
 Love (1927) - Marfa - Hostess at Inn (uncredited)
 Streets of Shanghai (1927) - Buttercup, Mary's Companion
 A Woman's Way (1928) - Mother Suzy
 Ramona (1928) - Marda
 The Charge of the Gauchos (1928) - Aunt Rosita
 You Know What Sailors Are (1928) - The British Captain
 The Rush Hour (1928) - Chanteuse at Bohemia Cafe (uncredited)
 The Sea Bat (1930) - Mimba
 Call of the Flesh (1930, and French language version Le chanteur de Séville) - La Rumbarita
 Romance (1930) - Vannucci
 Just Like Heaven (1930) - Madame Fogharde
 The Lash (1930) - Concha (uncredited)
 Along Came Youth (1930) - Bit Role (uncredited)
 The Lady Who Dared (1931) - Chambermaid (uncredited)
 The Hard Hombre (1931) - Maria Romero
 The Cuban Love Song (1931) - Aunt Rose
 Freaks (1932) - Madame Bartet (uncredited)
 Lady with a Past (1932) - Waitress (uncredited)
 Careless Lady (1932) - French Hotel Maid (uncredited)
 L'athlète incomplet (1932) - Eulalie
 Laughing at Life (1933) - Mamacita
 The Devil's in Love (1933) - Nana (uncredited)
 Design for Living (1933) - Heavy Woman (uncredited)
 Caravan (1934) - Gypsy (uncredited)
 All Men Are Enemies (1934) - Mamina
 A Wicked Woman (1934) - Proprietess (uncredited)
 Escapade (1935) - Carmen
 Here's to Romance (1935) - Viola
 Waterfront Lady (1935) - Mrs. Spadaloni
 Ceiling Zero (1936) - Mama Gini (uncredited)
 Robin Hood of El Dorado (1936) - Señora Matinez (uncredited)
 Poor Little Rich Girl (1936) - Tony's Wife
 Anthony Adverse (1936) - Mama Guisseppi
 The Longest Night (1936) - Fat Scrubwoman (uncredited)
 Along Came Love (1936) - Customer
 God's Country and the Woman (1937) - Mary, Jo's Housekeeper (uncredited)
 Wise Girl (1937) - Mama Guido (uncredited)

References

External links

1886 births
1938 deaths
Actresses from Bordeaux
French film actresses
French silent film actresses
20th-century French actresses
French emigrants to the United States